James Mylne may refer to:
 James Mylne (philosopher)
 James Mylne (artist)

See also
 James Milne (disambiguation)